Zvika, Tzvika or Tzvikah:

Tzvika Brot (born 1980), Israeli mayor of Bat Yam in the 21st century
Zvika Greengold (born 1952), Israeli officer awarded the Medal of Valor and politician
Tzvika Cohen, former drummer of the Israeli rock band Mofa Ha'arnavot Shel Dr. Kasper
Zvika Hadar (born 1966), Israeli actor, comedian and television host
Zvika or Svika Pick (born 1949), Israeli pop singer and composer
Tzvika Tzemah, Israeli football manager in the 21st century
Zvika Frank (born 1948), a Dutch-Israeli dancer, movement educator, university lecturer, and dance-movement therapist

Hebrew masculine given names
Informal personal names